In enzymology, a chitin deacetylase is an enzyme that catalyzes the chemical reaction

chitin + H2O  chitosan + acetate

Thus, the two substrates of this enzyme are chitin and H2O, whereas its two products are chitosan and acetate.

This enzyme belongs to the family of hydrolases, those acting on carbon-nitrogen bonds other than peptide bonds, specifically in linear amides.  The systematic name of this enzyme class is chitin amidohydrolase. This enzyme participates in aminosugars metabolism.

Structural studies

As of late 2007, only one structure has been solved for this class of enzymes, with the PDB accession code .

References

 

EC 3.5.1
Enzymes of known structure